Freedom Transit can refer to:
 Freedom Transit (Adams County, Pennsylvania)
 Freedom Transit (Washington County, Pennsylvania)